Krymchak may refer to:

 Krymchak people
 Krymchak language

Language and nationality disambiguation pages